Home audio systems are audio electronics intended for home entertainment use, such as shelf stereos, music centres and surround sound receivers. Home audio generally does not include standard equipment such as built-in television speakers, but rather accessory equipment, which may be intended to enhance or replace standard equipment, such as standard TV speakers. Since surround sound receivers, which are primarily intended to enhance the reproduction of a movie, are the most popular home audio device, the primary field of home audio is home cinema.

History

Monaural
Home audio dates back before electricity, to Edison's phonograph, a monaural, low fidelity sound reproduction format. Early electrical phonographs as well as many other audio formats started out as monaural formats.

Stereo
Stereophonic sound was invented as a means of creating a sound stage, a more realistic reproduction of the sound as recorded live. Stereo sound usually refers to two-channel audio, but technically it refers to anything better than monaural audio, as the term literally means "solid sound."

Quadraphonic
Quadraphonic sound was a four-channel reproduction system, which is considered to be the origin of surround sound. It was recorded on phonograph, tape, and a few CDs, and required a quadraphonic player for playback. The format was released in 1970 and never gained much popularity.

Surround sound
Surround sound formats were used in movie theatres dating back to Disney's Fantasia, and became available to consumers in the late 80's. There are many formats of surround sound, differing based on the type of decoding processor they used. Dolby Pro Logic is one of the oldest processors, creating four channels, and Dolby Pro Logic IIx is one of the newest, creating seven or eight discrete channels. Competing technologies have complicated the purchasing decisions of consumers.

Player equipment
High-fidelity (hi-fi) equipment became available to consumers, followed by boomboxes becoming popular in the 1980s due to availability of cheaper batteries.

See also
 Home cinema

References

Sources
 "Breaking the Sound Barrier" theage.com

Audio players
Consumer electronics